George Baker may refer to:

Arts
George Baker (British actor) (1931–2011), British film and television actor
George Baker (art historian) (born 1970), American art historian
George Baker (Indian actor) (born 1946), Indian actor and politician
George Baker (baritone) (1885–1976), British singer
George Baker (cartoonist) (1915–1975), Sad Sack comic strip
George Baker (Dutch singer) (born 1944), Dutch singer and songwriter
George Baker Selection, Dutch pop music group
George Baker (organist) (1773–1847), English musician
George C. Baker (born 1951), composer and organist
George D. Baker (1868–1933), American film director
George Herbert Baker (1878–1943), American Impressionist artist
George Melville Baker (1832–1890), American playwright and publisher
George Pierce Baker (1866–1935), American drama professor
George Philip Baker (1879–1951), British author
George Augustus Baker, American portrait painter

Politics
George Baker (Canadian politician) (born 1942), Canadian senator
George Baker (died 1723), British politician
George Barnard Baker (1834–1910), Canadian politician from Quebec
George Harold Baker (1877–1916), Canadian politician and lawyer
George Luis Baker (1868–1941), mayor of Portland, Oregon, 1917–1933
George W. C. Baker (1872–1953), councilman on the Los Angeles City Council, 1931–1937
George H. Baker (1859–1928), American politician in the state of Washington
George Baker (mayor), British industrialist, politician and philanthropist, mayor of Birmingham
George Ellis Baker, member of the New York State Assembly

Religion
Father Divine ( 1876–1965), American religious leader whose real name was possibly George Baker
George Baker (bishop) ( 1661–1665), Bishop of Waterford and Lismore
George Baker (archdeacon of Totnes) (1687–1772), British Anglican priest
George Baker (dean of Antigua) (fl. 1926–1970), Barbadian Anglican priest
A. George Baker (1849–1918), American Protestant clergyman who converted to Islam

Sports
George Baker (baseball) (1857–1915), Major League Baseball player
George Baker (cricketer, born 1838) (1838–1870), English cricketer, played for Kent
George Baker (cricketer, born 1849) (1849–1879), English cricketer, played for Middlesex
George Baker (cricketer, born 1862) (1862–1938), English cricketer, played for Yorkshire and Lancashire
George Baker (New Zealand cricketer) (1895–1962), New Zealand cricketer
George Baker (footballer) (born 1936), Wales international footballer
George Baker (jockey), English jockey

Others
George Baker (judge) (1910–1984), British judge
George Baker (inventor) (1844–1894), American submarine inventor
George Baker (surgeon) (1540–1600), English surgeon
George Baker (topographer) (1781–1851), topographer and historian of Northampton, England
George Baker (geologist) (1908–1975), Australian mineralogist and academic
George Charlie Baker (fl. 2006), perpetrator of the murder of Liam Ashley
George Fisher Baker (1840–1931), American banker and philanthropist
George Percival Baker (1856–1951), British botanist, mountaineer, and textile merchant and collector
George P. Baker (dean of Harvard Business School) (1903–1995), fifth dean of the Harvard Business School
George P. Baker (Herman C. Krannert Professor) (fl. 1987–present), American
Sir George Baker, 1st Baronet (1722–1809), British physician